The Three Trees is a 1643 print in etching and drypoint by Rembrandt, his largest landscape print. It was assigned the number B.212 by Adam von Bartsch and impressions of the work are in the Rijksmuseum, the Musée des beaux-arts du Canada and the Bibliothèque nationale de France.

Sources
http://www.gallery.ca/fr/voir/collections/artwork.php?mkey=1955
http://expositions.bnf.fr/rembrandt/grand/066_1.htm

1643 works
Landscape art
Prints by Rembrandt
Prints of the Rijksmuseum Amsterdam
Bibliothèque nationale de France collections